Waghorn is a surname. Notable people with the surname include:

Alexander de Waghorn (died 1418?), Roman Catholic Bishop of Ross
Dominic Waghorn, British journalist 
Eduardo Waghorn (born 1966), Chilean musician and composer
Frances Waghorn (1950–1994), English figure skater
H. T. Waghorn (1842–1930), English cricket statistician and historian
Kerry Waghorn (born 1947), Canadian syndicated caricaturist
Leslie Waghorn (1906–1979), English cricketer
Martin Waghorn (died 1787), officer of the Royal Navy
Martyn Waghorn (born 1990), English football striker
Richard Waghorn (1904–1931), English aviator, Royal Air Force pilot, and 1929 Schneider Trophy seaplane race winner
Thomas Fletcher Waghorn (1800–1850), English sailor, naval officer, and postal pioneer

See also
Miss Waghorn, a character in The Starlight Express